This is an overview of the 2008 Iranian legislative election in Tehran, Rey, Shemiranat and Eslamshahr electoral district.

Results

First round

Notes and references

 خواندنی‌های انتخابات تهران 

Parliamentary elections in Tehran
2000s in Tehran
2008 elections in Iran